Courteney Munn (born 10 December 1998) is a retired Australian rules footballer who played for North Melbourne and for St Kilda in the AFL Women's (AFLW).

AFLW career

North Melbourne
Munn was selected by North Melbourne at number 36 at the 2018 draft, and made her debut in round 3 of the 2019 season. She kicked 4 goals in her debut against the Western Bulldogs and for that performance she received a rising star nomination.

St Kilda
In April 2019, Munn joined expansion club St Kilda. In August 2020, she retired from football.

References

External links 

North Melbourne Football Club (AFLW) players
Living people
1998 births
St Kilda Football Club (AFLW) players